Adhibar ( Proprietor) is a 2015 Tamil-language action film directed by Surya Prakash. The film stars Jeevan and Vidya Pradeep with Nandha, Samuthirakani, Richard Rishi, and Ranjith playing supporting roles. The film was produced by T. Sivakumar, who also wrote the story for the film. The soundtrack was composed by newcomer Vikram Selva with editing done by Zashi Qmer and cinematography by Philip Vijayakumar. The film was released on 28 August 2015 to extremely negative reviews.

Cast

Production
Adhibar began production in early 2015 and was revealed to be an action comedy film directed by Surya Prakash, who had been an active director in the early 2000s having directed films like Maayi (2000) and Diwan (2003). The shoot was held across Chennai, Bangkok and Malaysia.

Soundtrack
"Avala" - Vikramselva
"En Kadhal" - Vikramselva
"Poi" - Gaana Bala
"Athibar" Theme music

Critical reception
Sudhir Srinivasan of The Hindu criticized the film stating "It is perhaps the most bizarre film I've seen in a long time". Now Running rated the film 3 out of 5 and wrote "Athibar is  an excellent written film and an awesomely narrated drama. It has few moments here and there." The Times of India rated 1.0 out of 5 and wrote "Adhibar is an exercise in mediocrity [..] We are told that the story is based on a real-life incident that happened in Sri Lanka, but there is so much randomness in the movie that we start wondering if real life can be this random. Characters behave in the most implausible manner and take instant decisions that no sane person in real life might take". Silverscreen stated "Adhibar tests your patience right from the beginning". The New Indian Express wrote, "Neither exciting nor refreshing, Adhibar is a dreary, mediocre fare".

References

External links
 

2015 films
2010s Tamil-language films
Indian action films
2015 action films